The Hugh M. Hefner First Amendment Award is an award created in honor of Playboy founder Hugh Hefner. The Hugh M. Hefner First Amendment Awards were established in 1979 to honor individuals who have made significant contributions in the vital effort to protect and enhance First Amendment rights for Americans. Since the inception of the awards, more than 100 individuals including high school students, lawyers, librarians, journalists and educators have been honored.

Nominees have traditionally come from the areas of journalism, arts and entertainment, education, publishing, law, and government, and winners are selected by a panel of distinguished judges.

Recipients

1980

Nat Hentoff – Book Publishing
Erwin Knoll and Howard Morland – Journalism
Saul Landau and Jack Willis – Journalism
David Goldberger – Law
Louis Clark – Government
Carey McWilliams – Lifetime Achievement

The judges were Tom Bradley, Mayor of Los Angeles; Jules Feiffer, playwright and social cartoonist; Fay Kanin, president, The Academy of Motion Picture Arts and Sciences; Victor Navasky, editor, The Nation; and Tom Wicker, columnist and associate editor, The New York Times.

1981

Frank Rowe – Book Publishing
Todd Crowder, Charles Reineke and William Hoffmann Jr. – Journalism
Edward Asner, Allan Burns, Seth Freeman, and Gene Reynolds – Arts and Entertainment
William Schannen III – Law
Morton Halperin – Government
Kathy Russell – Education
Stanley Fleishman – Lifetime Achievement

The judges were Edward Brooke, US Senator, Massachusetts; Nat Hentoff, author and columnist, The Village Voice; Fay Kanin, president, The Academy of Motion Picture Arts and Sciences; Judith Krug, director, The American Library Association; and Charles Nesson, Dean, Harvard Law School.

1982

Franklyn S. Haiman – Book Publishing
Gene D. Lanier – Education
Billie Pirner Garde – Government
Frank Snepp – Individual Conscience
Steven Pico – Law
Robert Berger, Herbert Brodkin, Ernest Kinoy and Herbert Wise – Arts and Entertainment
Melody Sands – Journalism
Frank J. Donner – Lifetime Achievement

The judges were Yvonne Braithwaite Burke, partner, Kutak, Rode & Huie; Hamilton Fish III, Publisher, The Nation; Florence McMullin, Chair, The Washington Library Association Intellectual Freedom Committee; and Aryeh Neier, Professor of Law, New York University.

1983

Tom Gish and Pat Gish – Outstanding Community Leadership
Mark Lynch – Outstanding National Leadership
Osmond K. Fraenkel – Lifetime Achievement

The judges were Harriet Pilpel, attorney, Weil, Gotshal & Manges; Studs Terkel, author and nationally syndicated radio show host; and William Worthy, international journalist and civil liberties activist.

1984

Helen Troy and Forest Troy – Outstanding Community Leadership
Agnus Mackenzie – Outstanding National Leadership
Frank Wilkinson – Lifetime Achievement

The judges were Martin Agronsky, Agronsky and Company; Alan Dershowitz, professor, Harvard Law School; and Liza Pike, Program Director, Center for Investigative Reporting.

1985

Clifford McKenzie – Government
Jack C. Landau – Education
Ronnie Dugger – Journalism

The judges were Burton Joseph, attorney, Barsy, Joseph & Lichtenstein; Harriet Pilpel, attorney, Weil, Gotshal & Manges; and Melody Sands, former owner of The Athens News.

1986-1987

Barry Lynn – Government
Glenna Nowell – Education
Walter Karp – Book Publishing
Charles Levendosky – Journalism
William A. Bradford, Jr., Ricki Seidman, and Mary Weidler – Law

The judges were Julius L. Chambers, president, NAACP Legal Defense and Educational Fund; Maxwell Lillienstein, General Counsel, American Booksellers Association; and Anthony Podesta, founding president, People for the American Way.

1988

Jamie Kalven – Book Publishing
Herbert Foerstel – Education
Rex Armstrong – Law
Eric Robert Glitzenstein – Government
David Arnett  – Journalism
Roy Woodruff – Individual Conscience

The judges were Charlayne Hunter-Gault, New York correspondent, The MacNeil / Lehrer NewsHour; Anthony Lewis, syndicated columnist, The New York Times; Steven Pico, First Amendment lecturer and advocate; and Tom Wicker, political columnist, The New York Times.

1989

Eve Pell – Journalism
James A. Haught – Journalism
Thomas Michael Devine – Government
Joann Bell – Law
John Henry Faulk – Individual Conscience
Louis Ingelhart – Education
Anthony Lewis – Lifetime Achievement

The judges were Judith Krug, director, the American Library Association for Intellectual Freedom; Jack K. Landau, attorney an columnist, Newhouse Newspapers; Clarence Page, Pulitzer Prize-winning columnist, Chicago Tribune; and Harriet Pilpel, attorney, Weil, Gotshal & Manges.

1990

Paul Conrad – Journalism
Marilyn Athmann – Education
Danny Goldberg – Arts and Entertainment
Hans A. Linde – Law
Dennis Barrie – Individual Conscience
Studs Terkel – Lifetime Achievement

The judges were Herbert N. Foerstel, Head of Branch Libraries, University of Maryland; Robert Scheer, national correspondent, Los Angeles Times; and Maxine Waters, US Representative, California.

1991

Allan Adler – Book Publishing
Inez Austin – Individual Conscience
Traci Bauer – Law
James Dana – Education
Bella Lewitzky – Arts and Entertainment
Debbie Nathan – Journalism
Sydney Schanberg – Government

The judges were Arthur Kropp, president, People for the American Way; Barry Lynn, Co-host, Battleline news radio talk show; Eve Pell, investigative journalist, Freedom of Information Project; and Tom Wicker, political columnist, The New York Times.

1992

Jules Feiffer – Individual Conscience
Bruce Rogow – Law
Natalie Robins – Book Publishing
Carl Jensen – Education
Dannie Martin – Journalism
Peter Sussman – Journalism

The judges were Dennis Barrie, executive director, Contemporary Arts Center of Cincinnati; Norman Dorsen, Stokes Professor of Law, New York University Law School; Mark Goodman, executive director, Student Press Law Center; Barbara Kopple, documentary filmmaker; and Reginald Stuart, Assistant News Editor, Knight-Ridder Newspapers.

1993-1994

Anthony Griffin – Law
Robert Landauer – Print Journalism
Jeff Cohen and Norman Solomon – Book Publishing
Carole Marlowe – Education
Jim Warren – Government
Jean Otto – Lifetime Achievement

The judges were Rex Armstrong, Attorney and Volunteer Counsel, ACLU of Oregon; Jessica Mitford, author and social activist; and Carl Jensen, Founder, Project Censored.

1995-1996

Jeffrey DeBonis – Government
Joycelyn Chadwick-Joshua – Education
Seth Rosenfeld – Print Journalism
Mary Morello – Arts and Entertainment
Tom Hull – Law
Morton Mintz – Lifetime Achievement

The judges were Chris Finan, executive director, The Media Coalition; Marjorie Heins, Director an Staff Counsel, ACLU Arts Censorship Project; and Sydney Schanberg, journalist.

1997

Dr. Frederic Whitehurst – Government
Kelli Peterson – Individual Conscience
Katharine Swan – Journalism
Cecile Richards – Education
American Civil Liberties Union – Law
American Library Association – Law

The judges were Anthony Griffin, attorney; Bobby Handman, president, People for the American Way; and Burton Joseph, attorney, Barsy, Joseph & Lichtenstein.

1998

Lee Brawner – Education
Tisha Byars – Individual Conscience
Goodloe Sutton and Jean Sutton – Journalism

The judges were Nadine Strossen, president, ACLU; Peter S. Prichard, president, Freedom Forum; and Ann K. Symons, president, American Library Association.

1999 

 Michael Moore – Arts and Entertainment
 Eugenie C. Scott – Education
 Nicholas Becker – Individual Conscience
 Jeri McGiverin & Elaine Williamson – Law
 Donald Parker – Lifetime Achievement
 Bruce Sanford – Book Publishing

The judges were Mark Goodman, executive director, Student Press Law Center; Molly Ivins, author and columnist, Creators Syndicate; Barbara Kopple, filmmaker; and Clarence Page, columnist, Chicago Tribune.

2000-2001 

 Michael Kent Curtis – Book Publishing
 Mary Dana – Education
 Nancy Zennie – Education
 William M. Lawbaugh – Print Journalism
 James Wheaton – Law
 John Seigenthaler - Lifetime Achievement
 Penn & Teller – Arts and Entertainment

The judges were Floyd Abrams, partner, Cahill Gordon & Reindel; Lucy Dalglish; executive director, Reporters Committee for Freedom of the Press; Robert M. O'Neil, director, Thomas Jefferson Center for the Protection of Free Expression; and Nadine Strossen, president, ACLU.

2002-2003 

 Trina Magi and Linda Ramsdell – Education
 Ronald K. L. Collins  and David Michael Skover – Book Publishing
 David Cole  – Book Publishing
 Nate Blakeslee – Law
 Steven Aftergood – Government
 Talia Buford – Print Journalism
 Bill Maher – Arts and Entertainment
 Molly Ivins – Lifetime Achievement

The judges were Margaret Carlson, CNN's The Capital Gang and Time Magazine columnist; Ann Richards, former governor of Texas; and John Seigenthaler, Founder, First Amendment Center.

2006 

 Paisley Dodds – Print Journalism
 Patricia Princehouse – Education
 Geoffrey R. Stone – Book Publishing
 Jack Spadaro – Government
 Shelby Knox, Marion Lipschutz, and Rose Rosenblatt – Arts and Entertainment
 Rhett Jackson – Lifetime Achievement

The judges were Katrina vanden Heuvel, editor and publisher, The Nation; Anthony D. Romero, executive director, American Civil Liberties Union; and Eugenie Scott, executive director, National Center for Science Education.

2008

Greg Lukianoff – Freedom of Expression
Heather Gillman – Law
Mark Klein – Government

The judges were Nadine Strossen, president, American Civil Liberties Union and professor of law, New York Law School; Geoffrey Stone, Edward H. Levi Distinguished Service Professor at University of Chicago Law School; and David Rubin, professor and former dean, S.I. Newhouse School of Public Communications, Syracuse University.

2012

Rebecca MacKinnon – Book Publishing
Pablo Alvarado – Law
Thomas Drake – Government
Jesselyn Radack – Government
Zack Kopplin – Education
Stanley K. Sheinbaum – Lifetime Achievement

The judges were Hector Villagra; Patricia Schroeder; Robert Scheer; and Norman Lear.

2013

Morris Davis – Government
Jessica Ahlquist – Education
Norman Lear – Lifetime Achievement
Marjorie Heins for her book Priests of Our Democracy: The Supreme Court, Academic Freedom, and the Anti-Communist Purge.

The judges were Henry Weinstein from the University of California, Ramona Ripston and Dr. Charles C. Haynes, Director of the Religious Freedom Education Project.

2014

Muneer Awad – Government
Glenn Greenwald – Journalism
Norman Dorsen – Lifetime Achievement
Thomas Healy – Book Publishing
Michael Hiestand and Mary Beth Tinker – For organizing the Tinker Tour
Chris Finan – Law

The judges were Margaret Carlson, Laura W. Murphy Director if the ACLU's Washington Legislative Office, and Joan E. Bertin Executive Director of National Coalition Against Censorship.

2015

Steve Listopad – Education
Malkia Cyril – Government
Zephyr Teachout – Book Publishing
James Risen – Print Journalism
Victor Navasky – Lifetime Achievement

2017

Burt Neuborne – Lifetime Achievement
Hasan Elahi – Arts & Entertainment
Timothy Garton Ash – Book Publishing
Jenni Monet – Print Journalism

The judges were Erwin Chemerinsky, Dean and Professor of Law, University of California Berkeley School of Law; Lara Bergthold, Principal Partner at RALLY; and Davan Maharaj, editor-in-chief and Publisher of the Los Angeles Times Media Group.

2018

Joan E. Bertin – Lifetime Achievement
Simon Tam – Arts & Entertainment
Laura Kipnis – Book Publishing
Allison Stranger – Education
Jamie Kalevn – Journalism

The judges were Michael A. Bamberger, Author and Senior Counsel at Dentons; Shelby Coffey III, Journalist; and Zephyr Teachout, Political Activist and Professor at Fordham University School of Law.

2019
Floyd Abrams – Lifetime Achievement
Christian Bales – Education
Theodore J. Boutrous – Law
Grace Marion – Journalism
George Luber – Government
Greg Lukianoff, Jonathan Haidt – Book Publishing

The judges were Karen Tumulty, Columnist and Correspondent; Neal Katyal Professor of Law and former Acting Solicitor General of the United States; and Michael B. Keegan, president of People for the American Way and People for the American Way Foundation.

2020
Ira Glasser – Lifetime Achievement
Michael Frazier – Education
David E. McCraw – Law
Omar Jimenez – Journalism
Andrea L. Dennis and Erik Nielson – Book Publishing
Christina Clusiau and Shaul Schwarz – Arts & Entertainment

The judges were Ted Boutros, partner at Gibson, Dunn & Crutcher LLP, and global co-chair of the firm's Litigation Group; and Kyle Pope, editor-in-chief and publisher of the Columbia Journalism Review.

2022
Michael Bamberger – Lifetime Achievement
Dawn Wooten – Government
Joslyn Diffenbaugh – Education
Amy Sohn – Book Publishing
Manuel Duran – Journalism

The judges were Allison Stanger, Russell Leng ’60 Professor of International Politics and Economics at Middlebury College; Julia B. Chan, editor-in-chief of The 19th, an independent, nonprofit newsroom; and Will Creeley, Legal Director of the Foundation for Individual Rights in Education (FIRE).

See also

Free Speech, "The People's Darling Privilege" book published in 2000, recognized with the award
William O. Douglas Prize

References
 - Source for all winners and judges

External links 
 Official website

Free expression awards
Awards established in 1979